Bailén is a Spanish geographical indication for Vino de la Tierra wines located in the autonomous region of Andalusia. Vino de la Tierra is one step below the mainstream Denominación de Origen indication on the Spanish wine quality ladder.

The area covered by this geographical indication comprises the following municipalities: Bailén, Baños de la Encina, Guarromán, Mengíbar, Torredelcampo and Villanueva de la Reina, in the province of Jaén (Andalusia, Spain).

It acquired its Vino de la Tierra status in 2004.

Grape varieties
 White: Molinera and Pedro Ximénez
 Rosé: Molinera and Tempranillo
 Red: Molinera, Tempranillo, Cabernet Sauvignon and Garnacha tinta

References

Spanish wine
Wine regions of Spain
Wine-related lists
Appellations